Jamie Annette Dantzscher (born May 2, 1982) is an American former artistic gymnast. She was a member of the bronze-medal-winning American team at the 2000 Olympics in Sydney.

Early life
Dantzscher was born in Canoga Park, California and raised in San Dimas, California. She graduated from San Dimas High School. She trained at Charter Oak Gliders in Covina under Beth Kline-Rybacki and Steve Rybacki.

Elite gymnastics career 
Dantzscher was a member of the United States national gymnastics team for eight years, starting in 1994. In her international debut, the 1996 City of Popes competition in France, she won the all-around and floor exercise titles.

She competed in her first senior U.S. Nationals in 1997, finishing sixth in the all-around. Her placement would have qualified her to the U.S. squad for the 1997 World Artistic Gymnastics Championships, but at 15, she was too young to meet the International Federation of Gymnastics' newly raised minimum age requirement. She went on to compete at the 1999 World Artistic Gymnastics Championships in Tianjin, where she placed sixth with the American team.

In 2000, Dantzscher won her first national all-around medal, a bronze. She placed fifth at the Olympic Trials, securing a berth on the U.S. team for the 2000 Summer Olympics in Sydney.

2000 Olympics 
Dantzscher fell on the floor exercise during the team preliminaries in Sydney but competed well in the team finals, scoring 9.429 on vault, 9.700 on the uneven bars and 9.712 on floor. The U.S. team initially finished fourth, behind Romania, Russia, and China.

Dantzscher was one of the most visible members of the U.S. Olympic team in the media because of her outspoken opposition to the policies of the national team coordinator, Béla Károlyi, whom she called a "puppeteer". Her opinions about Károlyi, which were echoed by some of her teammates and their coaches, were published in many major news outlets during the Olympics.

On April 28, 2010, Dantzscher and the other women on the 2000 Olympic team were awarded the bronze medal in the team competition when it was discovered that the Chinese team had falsified the age of one of its gymnasts, Dong Fangxiao. Dong's results were nullified, and the International Olympic Committee stripped the Chinese team of its medal.

NCAA career
After the Olympics, Dantzscher joined the UCLA Bruins gymnastics team. During her NCAA career, she achieved a UCLA record 28 perfect ten scores. In her first meet as a Bruin, she scored perfect tens on both of the events she competed, floor and bars, making her the first UCLA gymnast to score a perfect ten on her debut collegiate routine. In her four years of NCAA competition, Dantzscher achieved All-American honors 15 times, earned three Pac-10 individual titles, and was a part of three NCAA Championship-winning Bruins teams. She received the 2004 AAI Award.

Dantzscher was inducted into the UCLA Athletics Hall of Fame in 2016.

Career Perfect 10.0

Post-gymnastics career 
During the 2008–09 season, Dantzscher was an assistant coach for Arizona State. Before that, she coached at three gyms in California: Diamond Elite Gymnastics in Chino, Club Champion in Pasadena, and East Bay Sports Academy in Concord.

On March 29, 2017, Dantzscher was one of several former gymnasts who testified before Congress about the sexual abuse committed by USA Gymnastics' national team doctor, Larry Nassar. She indicated she had been abused "all over the world", and that she thought she was the only one.

Personal life

Dantzscher's parents and her six siblings all have first names beginning with the letter J. Two of her younger sisters, twins Janelle and Jalynne, also competed on the UCLA gymnastics team. Jalynne competed with the Bruins for one season before retiring from gymnastics because of a recurring injury. Dantzscher's oldest sister, Jennifer Pippin, died in April 2017 of asthma-related causes.

Dantzscher is a Latter-day Saint. She is the sister-in-law of Brandon Crawford, the San Francisco Giants shortstop, who is married to Jalynne Dantzscher.

In February 2017, three former gymnasts, Dantzscher, Jeanette Antolin and Jessica Howard, gave an interview with 60 Minutes in which they accused Larry Nassar of sexually abusing them. The gymnasts also alleged that the "emotionally abusive environment" at the national team training camps run by Béla and Márta Károlyi at the Karolyi Ranch gave Nassar an opportunity to take advantage of the gymnasts and made them afraid to speak up about the abuse.

References

1982 births
Living people
Latter Day Saints from California
American female artistic gymnasts
Gymnasts at the 1999 Pan American Games
Gymnasts at the 2000 Summer Olympics
Medalists at the 2000 Summer Olympics
Olympic bronze medalists for the United States in gymnastics
Pan American Games medalists in gymnastics
Pan American Games silver medalists for the United States
UCLA Bruins women's gymnasts
People from San Dimas, California
U.S. women's national team gymnasts
Medalists at the 1999 Pan American Games
NCAA gymnasts who have scored a perfect 10